The Orbital Debris Co-ordination Working Group (ODCWG) is one of the working groups of the International Organization for Standardization's Technical Committee 20/Subcommittee 14 TC20/SC14 "Spacecraft Systems and Operations".

History 
The Orbital Debris Co-ordination Working Group was formed by unanimous agreement at the May 2003 Plenary meeting of TC20/SC14.

Description 
The ODCWG recognizes that the mitigation of orbital space debris is an international concern, thus international, comprehensive and cohesive standards (namely ISO TC20/SC14) must be adopted to address the issue.

Currently six standards projects are in development, and a further seven project proposals are being prepared. The first debris mitigation standards were expected in 2008, with more International Standards, technical specifications or technical reports expected to be published through to 2011–2012.

See also
Inter-Agency Space Debris Coordination Committee

References

External links
The ODCWG's public folder on the ISO website.

International Organization for Standardization
Space debris
Space organizations